The demographics of Asian Americans describe a heterogeneous group of people in the United States who trace their ancestry to one or more Asian countries.

Manilamen began to reside in Louisiana as the first Asian Americans to live in the continental in the United States. Most Asian Americans have arrived after 1965. These individuals make up one-quarter of all immigrants who have arrived in the U.S. since 1965, and 59% of Asian Americans are foreign-born. During the 2010 United States Census the largest ethnic groups were Chinese American, Filipino Americans, Indian Americans, Vietnamese Americans, Korean Americans, and Japanese Americans.

The 2020 United States Census reported approximately 19.9 million people identified as Asian alone in 2020. Adding in the 4.1 million respondents who identified as Asian in combination with another race group, the Asian American population comprised 24 million people (7.2% of the total population).

The overall population is highly urbanized and is concentrated in the West Coast of the United States and New York metropolitan area. Generally, Asian Americans are well educated, and Asian American households have higher average incomes. However, socioeconomic status is not uniform among their population. Asian Americans hold diverse religious views, with substantial numbers being religiously unaffiliated or secular, Christian, Hindu, and Muslim. About 4-5% of Asian Americans identify as LGBT.

Background

The first recorded Asian Americans in the continental United States were a group of Filipino men who established the small settlement of Saint Malo, Louisiana, after fleeing mistreatment aboard Spanish ships. Since there were no women with them, the Manilamen, as they were known, married Cajun and Native American women. In 1778, Chinese and European explorers first arrived in Hawaii. Numerous Chinese and Japanese began immigrating to the US in the mid-19th century; numerous Chinese immigrants worked as laborers on the First transcontinental railroad, many who immigrated due to overpopulation and poverty experienced in Canton Province. In the mid-20th century, refugees from Southeast Asia fled wars in the homelands to come to the United States. Most Asian Americans who immigrated to the United States arrived after 1965, due to immigration reform that ended an earlier era of exclusion of Asian immigrants.

Population

According to the United States Census Bureau, the Asian American population, including those of multiracial and Hispanic and Latino ancestry, per its 2017 American Community Survey was about 22,408,464.

During the 2010 United States Census, there were a total of 17,320,856 Asian Americans, including Multiracial Americans identifying as part Asian. This made Asian Americans 5.6 percent of the total American population. The largest ethnic groups represented in the census were Chinese (3.79 million), Filipino (3.41 million), Indian (3.18 million), Vietnamese (1.73 million), Korean (1.7 million), and Japanese (1.3 million). Other sizable ethnic groups include Pakistani (409,000), Cambodian (276,000), Hmong (260,000), Thai (237,000), Laotian (232,000), Bangladeshi (147,000), and Burmese (100,000). The total population of Asian Americans grew by 46 percent from 2000 to 2010 according to the Census Bureau, which constituted the largest increase of any major racial group during that period. In 2010, there were an estimated 11,284,000 foreign born individuals who were born in Asia, of whom 57.7% had become naturalized citizens. Additionally, 209,128 were Hispanic and Latino, of whom the largest population (101,654) claim Mexico as their nation of origin.

The 2000 census recorded 11.9 million people (4.2 percent of the total population) who reported themselves as having either full or partial Asian heritage. The largest ethnic subgroups were Chinese (2.7 million), Filipino (2.4 million), Indian (1.9 million), Vietnamese (1.2 million), Korean (1.2 million), and Japanese (1.1 million). Other sizable groups included Cambodians (206,000), Pakistanis (204,000), Lao (198,000), Hmong (186,000), and Thais (150,000). About one-half of the Asian American population lived in the West, with California having the most total Asian Americans of any state, at 4.2 million. As a proportion of the total population, Hawaii is the only state with an Asian American majority population, at 58 percent; Honolulu County had the highest percentage of Asian Americans of any county in the nation, with 62 percent. In 2000, 69 percent of all Asian Americans were foreign born, except Japanese Americans, 60 percent of whom were born in the United States.

The Twenty-first United States Census, conducted in 1990, recorded 6.9 million people who were called American Asians. The largest ethnic groups were Chinese (23.8 percent), Filipino (20.4 percent), Japanese (12.3 percent), Indian (11.8 percent), Korean (11.6 percent), Vietnamese (8.9 percent), and Laotian (2.2 percent). Smaller populations, of less than two percent, were documented of the following ethnicities: Cambodian, Thai, Hmong, Pakistani, Indonesian, Malay, Bangladeshi, Sri Lankan, and Burmese. Two thirds of "American-Asians" lived in the five states of California, New York, Hawaii, Texas, and Illinois. Additionally their highest population concentrations were in California, New York, and Hawaii. In 1990, 66 percent of American Asians were foreign-born, with Vietnamese, Laotians, and Cambodians having this highest foreign born populations.

Distribution

The Asian American population is greatly urbanized, with nearly three-quarters of them living in metropolitan areas with population greater than 2.5 million. The three metropolitan areas with the highest Asian American populations are the Greater Los Angeles Area (1.868 million in 2007), the New York metropolitan area (1.782 million in 2007), and the San Francisco Bay Area (1,577,790 in 2007). New York City proper, according to the United States 2010 Census, is home to more than one million Asian Americans, greater than the combined totals of San Francisco and Los Angeles. This trend of a largely urban population continues to be observed in 2015, with significant populations in more expensive coastal cities, and less than five percent living in rural areas. Among the ten largest US cities, San Diego has the greatest proportion of Asian Americans. As of 2017, West (45%) and California (31%) had the most significant concentrations of the total Asian American populations; this keeps with historic trends of Asian Americans primarily residing in the Western United States, although there is a shift towards other regions of the United States beginning in the late 20th century.

According to the 2010 Census almost three quarters of all Asian Americans live in California, New York, Texas, New Jersey, Hawaii, Illinois, Washington, Florida, Virginia, and Pennsylvania. A large proportion of all Asian Americans live in California (5.6 million in 2010), New York (1.6 million in 2010), and Texas (1.1 million in 2010). Another state with a significant Asian American population is Massachusetts. Hawaii had the largest proportion of Asian Americans, with 57% of the state population identifying as Asian or multiracial with at least one part Asian. In Vermont in 2008, Asian Americans were the largest minority. Also, two U.S. territories (Guam and the Northern Mariana Islands) have large Asian populations — in 2010, Guam's population was 32.2% Asian, and the population of the Northern Mariana Islands was 49.9% Asian.

Asian American populations have grown significantly since the 1970s. However, they are underrepresented in several large urban areas, such as Chicago, Philadelphia, Dallas and Atlanta, although in some cases, Asian Americans are concentrated in specific urban neighborhoods or suburbs of these cities.

In regions with large numbers of Asian Americans, communities have developed that are heavily or predominantly Asian. Schools in these areas may offer instruction in languages such as Mandarin. These communities are often given unofficial names to reflect their populations, such as Chinatown, Little Manila, Little India, Japantown, Little Pakistan, Koreatown, Little Saigon, and Little Cambodia.

Trends
Asian Americans, on average, have higher incomes and education levels than White Americans. However, they also have higher poverty rates and lower home ownership rates. In addition, homeownership among Asian Americans has increased by twice as much as white Americans in recent years (see Homeownership in the United States).

Education

Asian Americans have the highest educational attainment of any racial group in the country; about 49.8% of them have at least a bachelor's degree. Since the 1990s, Asian American students often have the highest math averages in standardized tests such as the SAT and GRE. Their combined scores are usually higher than those of white Americans. The proportion of Asian Americans at many selective educational institutions exceeds the national population rate. Asians constitute around 10–20 percent of those attending Ivy League and other elite universities. Asian Americans are the largest racial group on seven of the nine University of California campuses, are the largest racial group of undergraduates in the system, and make up more than a quarter of graduate and professional students. Asian Americans are more likely to attend college, are more likely to apply to competitive colleges, and have significantly higher college completion level than other races. According to a poll targeting Asian Americans in 14 states and the District of Columbia conducted by the Asian American Legal Defense and Education Fund in 2013, 40 percent of Asian Americans have a college degree, with almost a quarter of them having achieved an education attainment greater than a bachelor's degree. That same year, Asian Americans in their late thirties had the highest percentage (65%) of college graduates for that age group than any other race or ethnicity in the United States. These high education attainment statistics contribute to a stereotype of academic and vocational excellence for Asian Americans.

However, there are concerns that the goal of diversity in American higher education has had a negative effect on Asians, with charges of quotas and discrimination starting in the 1980s. Asian American test scores are also bimodal—Asians are over represented both at high scores and low scores. A stereotype has been created that Asian Americans only study STEM and health-related fields at their universities (to become engineers, doctors, etc.). But according to a report by the College Board, Asian Americans do have academic interest in fields like social science, humanities, and education. According to an opinion piece written in The Harvard Crimson, Asian Americans are "over-represented" in higher education in the United States, specifically at elite colleges. This includes Harvard University & Massachusetts Institute of Technology, where over a fifth of undergraduates are Asian American. Similar increases in Asian American enrollment was found in the University of California system, especially in the late 20th century. However, only a small number of institutions are presented, usually selective enrollment institutions, thus making it appear that Asian Americans make up a large part of a university's student population. Moreover, this discrimination brought upon Asian Americans in education has encouraged the model minority stereotype in American society. The high expectations placed on Asian American students often cause the problems faced by these students to be overlooked. Issues related to social pressure and mental health are often overlooked due to the idea of the model minority. Education is one of the main aspects that are given a high regard in the social expectations of Asian Americans.

Income

While Asian Americans have higher household and personal income levels than any other racial demographic, the Asian poverty rate is higher than that of European Americans. In 2005, the median per capita income for Asian Americans was estimated at $27,331, compared to $26,496 for Whites, $16,874 for African Americans, and $14,483 for those identifying as Hispanic or Latino; the median household income of Asian Americans was estimated at $61,094, compared to $48,554 for European Americans. Additionally 28 percent of Asian American households had incomes exceeding $100,000, compared to 18 percent of the overall population. In 2006, Asian American households were slightly larger than other households, with fewer households with no earners.

In 2008, Asian American households had the highest median income in the US, at $65,637; however, 11.8 percent of Asians were in poverty in 2004, higher than the 8.6 percent rate for non-Hispanic whites. This is largely due to the fact that a high percentage of Asian Americans are immigrants, and independently of race, immigrants are more likely than the native-born to be poor. Once country of birth and other demographic factors are taken into account, Asian Americans are no more likely than non-Hispanic whites to live in poverty. Much of this poverty is concentrated in ethnic enclaves, such as Chinatowns. 

In 2010, the median household income of Asian Americans had increased to $67,022. As with educational achievement, economic prosperity is not uniform among all Asian American groups. In 2005 Census figures show that an average white male with a college diploma earns around $66,000 a year, while similarly educated Asian men earn around $52,000 a year.

However, by 2008, according to the College Board and United States Census Bureau, Asian American males with similar education achievement as their White American male counterparts earned more than their White American male counterparts (median AM = $71K, median WM = $66K). Asian American females also earned more than their White American female counterparts (median AF = $67K, median WF = $51K).

As of 2015, that trend continued.

Population growth
Asian American population growth is fueled largely by immigration. Natural population growth accounts for a small proportion of the 43 percent increase in total Asian American population between 2000 and 2010.

Asian American alone

With multiracial identifiers

Population estimate in 2017 with multiracial identifiers

Language

According to the 2000 Census, the more prominent languages of the Asian American community include the Chinese languages (Mandarin, Cantonese, Taishanese, and Hokkien), Tagalog, Vietnamese, Korean, Japanese, Hindi, Tamil, Telugu, and Gujarati. In 2008, Chinese, Japanese, Korean, Tagalog, and Vietnamese languages were all used in elections in Alaska, California, Hawaii, Illinois, New York, Texas, and Washington state.

In 2010, there were 2.8 million people (5 and older) who spoke a Chinese language at home; after the English and Spanish languages, it is the third most common language in the United States. Other sizeable Asian languages are Tagalog, Vietnamese, and Korean, with all three having more than 1 million speakers in the United States.

In 2012, Alaska, California, Hawaii, Illinois, Massachusetts, Michigan, Nevada, New Jersey, New York, Texas and Washington were publishing election material in Asian languages in accordance with the Voting Rights Act. These include Tagalog, Mandarin Chinese, Vietnamese, Hindi and Bengali. Election materials were also available in Gujarati, Japanese, Khmer, Korean, and Thai. According to a 2013 poll conducted by the Asian American Legal Defense and Education Fund, 48 percent of Asian Americans considered media in their native language as their primary news source.

Religion

Asian American religious preferences are wide-ranging and tend to be more diverse than those other races in the United States. The growth of Asian American immigration since 1965 has contributed to this diversity. Until recently, a dearth of scholarship regarding Asian American religious beliefs led to a stereotype that Asian Americans are not religious or spiritual. Although 59 percent of Asian Americans believe strongly in the existence of one or more gods, 30 percent identify as "secular" or "somewhat secular." Only 39 percent of Asian American households belong to a local church or temple, due to atheism or adherence to Eastern religions without congregational traditions.

No religious affiliation claims a majority of Asian Americans. The Trinity College American Religious Identification Survey (ARIS) in 2008 found that of Asian Americans, 27% identified as none or agnostic, 21% identified with an Eastern religion, 17% identified as Catholic, 10% identified as generically Christian, 6% identified as mainline Protestant, 3% identified as Baptist, 2% identified as Penecostal or other Protestant, and 8% identified as Muslim. A separate 2008 survey of the Pew Forum on Religion & Public Life found that 17% of Asians identify as Catholic, 17% as evangelical Protestant, 14% as Hindu, 11% as secular, 3% as atheist, 4% as agnostic, and 5% as other unaffiliated. In 2012, a Pew Research Center survey of the Faiths of Asian Americans found that a plurality of Asian American respondents (42%) were Christian, followed by those who were unaffiliated (26%), Buddhist (14%), Hindu (10%), and Muslim (4%). The 2008 Pew survey found that about a third of American Buddhists are Asian.

Both the 2008 ARIS survey and the 2008 Pew survey found that of all major U.S. demographics, Asian Americans had the highest number of respondents who did not claim a religion or refused to divulge their religious affiliation. A Gallup poll conducted in 2010 found that Asian Americans were the group least likely to say that religion was important in their daily lives, although a 54 percent majority of respondents still said that religion was important in their daily lives.

Filipino Americans are majority Catholic, and a significant minority of Vietnamese Americans are as well.  Most Muslim Asian Americans come from, or trace their ancestry to, Bangladesh, China, India, Indonesia, Malaysia, and Pakistan.

Sexuality
According to a Gallup survey conducted from June to September 2012, 4.3 percent of Asian Americans self identify as LGBT. This compares with 4.6 percent of African-Americans, 4 percent of Hispanic-Americans, 3.2 percent of Caucasian-Americans, and the overall 3.4 percent of American adults that self identify as LGBT in the total population.

In a Gallup survey conducted in 2017, 4.9 percent of Asian Americans identified as LGBT, representing the second-highest growth of LGBT representation among African Americans, Hispanic Americans, and Caucasian Americans.

U.S. states and territories

The above list displays the population of Asian Americans ("Alone, or in combination") in US states, Puerto Rico, and the District of Columbia, according to the 2010 United States Census

Origins of the Asian population (2010 Census)

Chinese Americans figures include Taiwanese Americans; Data for the territories (except Puerto Rico) is from American FactFinder's 2010 United States Census datahttps://factfinder.census.gov/faces/tableservices/jsf/pages/productview.xhtml?pid=DEC_10_GUSF_P3&prodType=table  American FactFinder. Ethnic Origin Or Race; 2010 Guam Summary File. Retrieved November 9, 2018.https://factfinder.census.gov/faces/tableservices/jsf/pages/productview.xhtml?pid=DEC_10_VISF_P3&prodType=table  American FactFinder. Race; 2010 U.S. Virgin Islands Summary File. Retrieved November 9, 2018.

See also
List of U.S. cities with Asian American majority populations
Middle Eastern Americans

References

Notes

External links
Asian-Nation Asian American Socioeconomic Statistics and Comparisons

Asian-American issues
Asian
Minorities